Wyoming Highway 174 (WYO 174) is a short  Wyoming state road located in central Hot Springs county. WYO 174 acts as a spur off WYO 170 to some ranches west of the junction.

Route description
Wyoming Highway 174 begins its western end at Hot Springs County Route 1 near Red Creek Ranch. Traveling east for just over a half-a-mile, WYO 174 reaches Wyoming Highway 170 and ends almost as soon as it began. Highway 174 lies approximately 5.5 miles south of Owl Creek.

Major intersections

References

External links 

Wyoming State Routes 100-199
WYO 174 - WYO 170 to Hot Springs CR 1

Transportation in Hot Springs County, Wyoming
174
State highways in the United States shorter than one mile